Nabis rufusculus is a species of damsel bug in the family Nabidae. It is found in North America.

References

Further reading

External links

 

Nabidae
Insects described in 1872
Articles created by Qbugbot